Miss Australia was the title for the winner of the Miss Australia Quest or the Miss Australia Awards, which ran from 1954 until 2000, when the last Miss Australia was named. From 2002, the Miss World Australia contest has been held, and the Miss Universe Australia contest has been held since 2004.

The title of Miss Australia had existed since 1908, although it was not until 1954 that it became associated with the Spastic Centres of Australia. The Miss Australia Quest was sponsored and organised from 1954 until the early 1960s by the lingerie manufacturer, Hickory, until Dowd Associates transferred the ownership to the Australian Cerebral Palsy Association in 1963.

From 1926 to 1991 the program operated as the Miss Australia Quest, after which the name was changed to the Miss Australia Awards to reflect changing community attitudes.  
 
Miss Australia raised money for the Spastic Centres of Australia through her family and friends. She was judged on merit, as well as raising the monies for children and adults with cerebral palsy.

The pearl-encrusted Miss Australia crown, worn by titleholders from 1965 to 1991. The crown was hand-crafted in silver and blue velvet, and decorated with more than 800 pearls. Designed by Melbourne artist Ernest Booth and manufactured in Japan, the crown was presented to the Miss Australia Quest in 1965 by Toyomoto Australia Pty Ltd. The crown was last used in 1991, and is held at the National Museum of Australia.

History

The first Miss Australia contest was held in 1908 as a one-off event sponsored through the Lone Hand, with entrants from New South Wales, Victoria and Queensland. The winner was Alice Buckridge from Victoria. The primary purpose of the contest was "to attract customers: whether they were newspaper readers, patrons at an amusement venue or visitors to a country fair" (Saunders and Ustinoff, 2005:4)

The Miss Australia contests of 1926 and 1927 were sponsored by Smith's Weekly magazine and Union Theatres, with heats from each State, and were straightforward beauty contests, judged by an anonymous panel from the staff of the magazine and associated publications. Miss Australia 1937 was again sponsored by Smith's Weekly and again had heats in each State, but judging criteria were far broader, and the judging panel comprised prominent women. The prizes for the first two centred around film tests and an escorted trip to the movie capitals of America. The 1937 prize was a chaperoned first-class travel world tour which included London for the Coronation season. Smith's Weekly was not involved in later Quests.

In 1953, the contest was revised by Bernard J. Dowd to promote the American Hickory lingerie that he marketed in Australia. A panel of Hickory-appointed judges in each state selected a winner based on photos sent it by young women, and then a national panel of Hickory-appointed judges chose the winner, Miss Australia.

In 1954, Colin Clay of the Queensland Spastic Welfare League asked Hickory if the Miss Australia competition could be used as a fundraiser for the league. Hickory agreed and from then on the contestants raised money for the league. Each state branch of the league would conduct its own contest to find a state winner, known as Miss Queensland, Miss New South Wales, etc, based on traditional "beauty contest" critieria. They would also award Miss Queensland Charity Queen, Miss New South Wales Charity Queesland, etc to the young woman who raised the most money in each state. The state finalists would then compete in the national competition for Miss Australia and Miss Australia Charity Queen.

In 1963, Dowd assigned all rights to the contest to the League.

Titleholders  

 1908 – Alice Buckridge
 1926 – Beryl Mills of Geraldton, Western Australia
 1927 – Phyllis Von Alwyn of Launceston, Tasmania
 1937 – Sheila Martin of Wagga Wagga, New South Wales
 1946 – Rhonda Kelly
 1947 – Judy Gainford
 1948 – Beryl James
 1949 – Margaret Hughes
 1950 – 1952 No Miss Australia as a result of the dispute between Miss Australia 1949 and her chaperon.
 1953 – Maxine Morgan
 1954 – Shirley Bliss
 1955 – Maureen Kistle
 1956 – June Finlayson
 1957 – Helen Wood
 1958 – Pam Mackay
 1959 – Joan Stanbury
 1960 – Rosemary Fenton
 1961 – Tania Verstak
 1962 – Tricia Reschke
 1964 – Jan Taylor
 1965 – Carole Jackson
 1966 – Sue Gallie
 1967 – Margaret Rohan
 1968 – Helen Newton
 1969 – Suzanne McClelland
 1970 – Rhonda Iffland
 1971 – June Wright
 1972 - Krystyna Sztanska (Miss Victoria International)
 1972 – Gay Walker
 1973 – Michelle Downes
 1974 – Randy Baker
 1975 – Kerry Doyle
 1976 – Sharon Betty
 1977 – Francene Maras
 1978 – Gloria Krope
 1979 – Anne Sneddon
 1980 – Eleanor Morton
 1981 – Melissa Hannan / Leanne Dick
 1982 – Jenny Coupland
 1983 – Lisa Cornelius
 1984 – Maryanne Koznjak
 1985 – Maria Ridley
 1986 – Tracey Pearson
 1987 – Judi Green
 1988 – Caroline Lumley
 1989 – Lea Dickson
 1990 – Rebecca Noble
 1991 – Helena Wayth
 1992 – Suzanne Lee
 1993 – Joanne Dick
 1994 – Jane Bargwanna
 1995 – Margaret Tierney
 1996 – Suzanne Haward
 1997 – Tracy Secombe
 1998 – Suellen Fuller
 1999 – Kathryn Hay
 2000 – Sheree Primer

Miss Australia at International pageants
Australia is now represented by either Miss Universe Australia or Miss World Australia:

 1952 – Leah MacCartney
 1953 – Maxine Morgan (4th RU)
 1954 – Shirley Bliss
 1955 – no (Universe), Beverly Prowse (World Miss – semi-finalist)
 1956 – no (Universe)
 1957 – no (Universe), June Finlayson (Miss World)
 1958 – Astrid Tanda Lindholm
 1959 – no (Universe)
 1960 – no (Universe)
 1961 – no (Universe)
 1962 – no (Universe)
 1963 – no (Universe)
 1964 – Maria Luyben
 1965 – Pauline Verey (Miss Universe – semi-finalist), Jan Rennison (Miss World)
 1966 – no (Universe)
 1967 – no (Universe), Judy Lockey (Miss World)
 1968 – Lauren Jones (Miss Universe), Penelope Plummer (Miss World 1968)
 1969 – Joanne Barret (Miss Universe 2nd RU), Stefane Meurer (Miss World)
 1970 – Joan Lydia Zealand (Miss Universe-2nd RU), Valli Kemp (Miss World-Semi-finalist)
 1971 – Tony Suzanne Rayward (Miss Universe-1st RU), Valerie Roberts (Miss World-Semi-finalist)
 1972 – Kerry Anne Wells (Miss Universe 1972), Belinda Green (Miss World 1972)
 1973 – Susan Mainwaring (Miss Universe), Virginia Radinas (World)
 1974 – Yasmin May Nagy (Miss Universe-Semi-finalist), Gail Margaret Petith (World-3rd RU)
 1975 – Jennifer Matthews(Miss Universe), Anne Davidson (World-Semi-finalist)
 1976 – Julie Anne Ismay (Miss Universe-4th RU), Karen Jo Pini (Miss World-1st RU)
 1977 – Jill Maree Minahan(Miss Universe), Jaye-Leanne Hopewell (Miss World – finalist)
 1978 – Beverly Frances Pinder (Miss Universe),Denise Ellen Coward (Miss World – 2nd RU)
 1979 – Kerry Dunderdale (Miss Universe), Jodie Anne Day (Miss World – 3rd RU)
 1980 – Katrina Judith Rose Redina (Miss Universe), Linda Leigh Shepherd (Miss World)
 1981 – Karen Sang (Miss Universe Australia), Melissa Hannan (Miss World – finalist & Queen of Oceania)
 1982 – Lou-Anne Caroline Ronchi(Miss Universe & Miss International – semi-finalist), Catherine Anne Morris (Miss World – semi-finalist & Queen of Oceania)
 1983 – Simone Cox (Universe), Tanya Bowe (Miss World, Queen of Oceania)
 1984 – Donna Thelma Rudrum (Miss Universe), Lou-Anne Caroline Ronchi(Miss World – 2nd RU)
 1985 – Elizabeth Rowly (Miss Universe), Angelina Nasso (Miss World)
 1986 – Lucinda Bucat (Miss Universe & Miss International 86), Stephanie Eleanor Andrews (Miss World)
 1987 – Jennine Susan Leonarder(Miss Universe), Vanessa Gibson (Miss International – semi-finalist), Donna Thelma Rudrum (Miss World)
 1988 – Vanessa Gibson (Miss Universe), Catherine Bushell (Miss World – Semi-finalist & Queen of Oceania)
 1989 – Karen Wenden (Miss Universe, Miss Photogenic), Natalie McCurry (Semi-finalist & Queen of Oceania)
 1990 – Charmaine Ware (Miss Universe), Karina Brown (Miss World)
 1991 – no (Universe), Leanne Buckle (Miss World-1st RU & Queen of Oceania)
 1992 – Georgina Denahy (Miss Universe-Semi-finalist), Rebecca Simic (Miss World)
 1993 – Voni Delfos (Miss Universe-finalist) Karen Ann Carwin (Miss World)
 1994 – Michelle van Eimeren (Miss Universe), Skye Edwards (Miss World)
 1995 – Jacqueline Shooter (Miss Universe), Melissa Porter (Miss World – semi-finalist)
 1996 – Jodie McMullen (Miss Universe), Nicole Smith (Miss World)
 1997 – Laura Csortan (Miss Universe-, Miss Amity & Miss world – semi-finalist)
 1998 – Renee Henderson (Miss Universe), Sarah Jane St.Clair (Miss World)
 1999 – Michelle Shead (Miss Universe), Kathryn Hay (Miss World)
 2000 – Samantha Frost (Miss Universe), Renee Henderson (Miss World)
 2001 – no (Miss Universe), Eva Milic (Miss World), Christy Anderson (Miss Earth)
 2002 – Sarah Davies (Miss Universe), Nicole Gazal (Miss Australia World – semi-finalist), Ineke Candice Leffers (Miss Earth)
 2003 – Ashlea Talbot (Miss Universe), Olivia Stratton (Miss Australia World – winner; Miss World People's Choice), Shivaune Christina Field(Miss Earth)
 2004 – Jennifer Hawkins (Miss Universe 2004), Sarah Davies (Miss Australia World – semi-finalist), Alethea Lindsay (Miss World Australia runner up), Shenevelle Dickson (Miss Earth – finalist)
 2005 – Michelle Guy (Miss Universe), Alethea Lindsay (Miss Universe Australia runner up), Denae Brunow (Miss Australia World), Ann Maree Bowdler (Miss Earth)
 2006 – Erin McNaught (Miss Universe), Sabrina Houssami (Miss Australia World – 2nd runner up, Miss Asia Pacific World), Victoria Winter (Miss Earth)
 2007 – Kimberley Busteed (Miss Universe), Caroline Pemberton (Miss Australia World), Victoria Stewart (Miss Earth)
 2008 – Laura Dundovic (Miss Universe- top 10 finalist), Katie Richardson (Miss Australia World), Rachael Smith (Miss Earth),
 2009 – Rachael Finch (Universe – 3rd runner up), Sophie Lavers (Miss Australia World – Miss World Talent 2009 3rd runner up)
 2010 – Jesinta Franklin (Universe – 2nd Runner up), Ashleigh Francis (Miss Australia World)
 2011 – Scherri-Lee Biggs (Universe – top 10 finalists), Amber Greasley (Miss World Australia – Miss World quarter finalist)
 2012 – Renae Ayris (Universe – 3rd Runner up), Jessica Kahawaty (Miss Australia World – Miss World 2nd runner up)
 2013 – Olivia Wells (Miss Universe), Erin Holland (Miss World Australia – Miss World Oceania), Kelly Louise Maguire (Miss Grand Australia- Miss Grand International 4th runner up).
  2014 –  Tegan Martin, (Universe – top 10 finalists); Courtney Thorpe (Miss World Australia – Miss World Oceania – top 5); Renera Thompson (Miss Grand Australia- Miss Grand International 3rd runner up).
  2015 –  Monika Radulovic, (Universe – top 5 finalists); Tess Alexander (Miss World Australia – Miss World Oceania – top 11); Claire Elizabeth Parker (Miss Grand Australia- Miss Grand International Winner).
  2016 –  Caris Tiivel (Miss Universe), Madeline Cowe (Miss World Australia – Top 20); Dani Fitch (Miss Grand Australia- Miss Grand International Top 20 finalist)

Australia at Miss Global 
Color keys

Famous Miss Australias 

One of the most famous Miss Australias was Tania Verstak. She was born in China of Russian parents, and when she won Miss Australia in 1961, she was the first woman of an immigrant background to win the award. Verstak's daughter is the actor Nina Young.

The 1960 Miss Australia, Rosemary Fenton, became the second wife of Ian Sinclair, former leader of the federal National Party and Speaker of the House of Representatives.

The 1960 "Miss Darling Downs" was Gay Kayler, a multiple beauty quest title holder, television personality, award-winning country music entertainer and recording artist.

The 1973 Miss Australia, Michelle Downes, was the second wife (1974–75) of Peter Brock.

1981 saw the Miss Australia Quest Pageants’ youngest ever entrant. Suzi Harvey at just 16 years of age was keen to raise awareness as well as donations. She was sponsored by two local business owners, Dianne Thorpe and Betty Roman.Suzi hosted fundraisers every weekend. 

The first Aboriginal woman to win the Miss Australia title was Kathryn Hay in 1999. Hay subsequently became a Cabinet Secretary in the Tasmanian government.

The 1994 Miss Australia Universe, Michelle van Eimeren, became a household name when she stayed in the Philippines, became an actress and married a Filipino comedian-actor-singer, Ogie Alcasid.

Stories from the people involved 

In 2007, a National Museum of Australia exhibition, Miss Australia: A Nation's Quest, told the stories of titleholders, volunteers, fundraisers and sponsors involved in the Miss Australia Quest. Historic dresses, trophies and crowns were also included in the exhibition.

Miss Australia in International Beauty Pageants 

There are now multiple competitions  using Miss Australia in their title. To differentiate amongst the official national preliminaries to international competitions, the franchise name is added to Miss Australia.

For example, Australia's Miss Universe contestants never came from The Spastic Centres Association Miss Australia. A local modelling agency selected representatives through small beauty pageants and screenings.

In 2002 Jim Davie revived Miss Universe in Australia by setting up the Miss Universe Australia organisation. This contest, which exclusively sends contestants to Miss Universe, was made famous by Jennifer Hawkins's victory in the 2004 Miss Universe pageant in Quito, Ecuador. Jennifer became only the second Australian woman ever to win the international title, following Kerry Anne Wells who won the pageant in 1972.

For the Miss World contest, a Miss World Australia is chosen through screenings. In previous years, titleholders from the original Miss World Australia contest were sent to Miss World. However, this was not the case in 2006, when the national contest was cancelled and Sabrina Houssami was controversially crowned the winner. Penelope Plummer became Australia's first Miss World in 1968.

See also 

 Miss Universe Australia
 Miss World Australia
 Miss International Australia
 Miss Earth Australia

 Beryl Mills
 Daphne Campbell

Notes

References

External links
Miss Australia and Charity/Fundraisers 1954 – 2000 (with photos) Miss Australia Titleholders 1954 to 2000. thespasticcentre.org.au
Miss New South Wales and Charity/Fundraisers 1954 – 2000 (with photos)  Miss New South Wales Titleholders 1954 to 2000. thespasticcentre.org.au
 Miss Australia: A retrospective 1908–2000 Katherine Beard (Hindmarsh, S. Aust. : Crawford House Publishing, c2001)
Miss Universe Australia website
Miss World Australia website
Miss Australia Crown at the National Museum of Australia

Beauty pageants in Australia
1908 establishments in Australia
Australian awards
2008 disestablishments in Australia
Australia